William A. Connelly (June 2, 1931 – November 24, 2019) was a United States Army soldier who served as the sixth Sergeant Major of the Army. He was sworn in on July 2, 1979, and served until June 1983. He is best known for removing the specialist ranks of specialist 5 through specialist 7.

Military career
Ordered to active duty in March 1954, Connelly was a tank crewman, tank commander, platoon sergeant and first sergeant in the 761st Tank Battalion, 3rd Armored Division at Fort Knox, Kentucky. The first of his four tours in Europe was with the 826th Tank Battalion at Hammelburg and Schweinfurt, Germany, from January 1955 until November 1956. The 826th returned to Fort Benning, Georgia, where Connelly served as an Operations Sergeant and platoon sergeant until August 1958. He returned to Europe, serving as platoon sergeant with the 2/67th Armor, 4th Armored Division in Fürth, Germany, from August 1958 through September 1961. He was back in the United States at Fort Stewart, Georgia, as a platoon sergeant with the 3d Medium Tank Battalion, 32d Armor for less than 30 days when that unit was sent to Germany as part of the build up during the Berlin crisis of October 1961.

Connelly remained in Augsburg serving as a platoon sergeant with the 3/32d Armor until November 1962. He was assigned to Munich, Germany, as a first sergeant and Operations Sergeant in the 32nd Tank Battalion, and 24th Infantry Division. Back at Fort Stewart, Georgia, in August 1964, Connelly served as first sergeant of Company C, 4th Battalion, 68th Armor, 2d Infantry Division. In October 1965, his company was ordered to the Dominican Republic, where it served until July 1966. In January 1967, Connelly assumed duties as Chief Enlisted Adviser to the Cavalry Squadron or the Georgia National Guard, headquartered in Griffin, Georgia.

Connelly had combat duty in Vietnam as first sergeant of Troop B, 1st Squadron, 9th Cavalry, 1st Cavalry Division from October 1969 to November 1970. From then until May 1973, Connelly served at Fort Knox, Kentucky as first sergeant of the reception Station and several companies of the First Training Brigade, as well as sergeant major of the 1st and 2d Battalions.

Upon graduation Connelly was assigned to Germany for his fourth European tour. Connelly initially served as sergeant major of the 1/35th Armor, 1st Armored Division at Erlangen. In June 1975, he became sergeant major of the Seventh Army Training Command Grafenwöhr and in July 1976, became sergeant major of the 1st Armored Division at Ansbach. From that position, he was nominated and selected to the position of sergeant major of the United States Army Forces Command, Fort McPherson, Georgia, in July 1977.

Connelly was selected as sixth Sergeant Major of the Army, serving 1979 to 1983. He is best known for removing the specialist ranks of specialist 5 through specialist 7.

Awards and decorations

Doughboy Award Primicerius- [Order of Saint Maurice Medal]

 9 Service stripes.

References

The Sergeants Major of the Army,  Daniel K. Elder, Center of Military History, United States Army Washington, D.C. 2003.

https://www.ausa.org/news/retired-sma-william-connelly-dies-88

1931 births
People from Monticello, Georgia
United States Army personnel of the Vietnam War
Recipients of the Distinguished Service Medal (US Army)
Recipients of the Air Medal
Recipients of the Gallantry Cross (Vietnam)
Sergeants Major of the Army
United States Army Sergeants Major Academy alumni
2019 deaths